If I Were for Real is a 1981 Mandopop album by Teresa Teng released in Hong Kong by Polydor Records as Love Songs of the Island-Nation, Vol. 7: If I Were for Real (島國之情歌第七集—假如我是真的). "  This album was later introduced in Taiwan by Kolin Records.

Island-Nation" refers to Japan, as 5 tracks were covers of Japanese songs.

The title track was the theme song of the 1981 drama film of the same name. (The character Farm Director Zheng in the film was a big Teresa Teng fan.) The song was later covered by many singers including Faye Wong in Decadent Sound of Faye.

Track listing

Several tracks were Mandarin covers of Japanese songs:
"Bieli" was a cover of Los Indios & Silvia's 1979 song "Wakaretemo Sukina Hito" (別れても好きな人; "People Who Like Even Farewells")
"Meng" was a cover of Kei Ogura's 1971 song "Kono Sora no Aosa wa" (この空の青さは; "The Blueness of the Sky")
"Qing Hu" was a cover of Teng's 1980 song "Taipei no Yoru" (台北の夜; "The Night of Taipei")
"Shancha Hua" was a cover of Mieko Makimura's 1978 song "Michi Dure" (みちづれ; "The Fellow Traveler")
"Wo Yu Qiufeng" was a cover of Ryōtarō Sugi's 1976 song "Sukima Kaze" (すきま風; "Draft")

In the Polydor edition, sides one and two of the Kolin edition were reversed. An addition track was included, "Qingfeng" (輕風; "Breeze"), written by Chuang Nu and composed by Chen Hsin-yi. "Qingfeng" was featured in the 1981 film Spring Fever. In addition, the title of "Jiaru" was changed to "Jiaru Meng'er Shi Zhende" (假如夢兒是真的; "If Dreams Were for Real").

References

 (Polydor version)

Teresa Teng albums
1981 albums
Mandopop albums